The Rajmahal Hills are located in the Santhal Pargana division of Jharkhand, India. They were located on the northern margin of the Gondwana supercontinent, and its hills are today inhabited by the Sauria Paharia people whilst its valleys are dominated by the Santhal people.

Volcanic activity during the Jurassic resulted in the formation of the Rajmahal Traps.

The Rajmahal hills are named after the town of Rajmahal which lies in the eastern Jharkhand. The River Ganges wanders around the hills changing the direction of flow from east to south.

Francis Buchanan-Hamilton travelled through the Rajmahal hills in the early 19th century. He described the hills that seemed impenetrable in a zone where few travellers had been. He wrote that everywhere people were hostile, apprehensive of officials and unwilling to talk and, in some cases, left their villages and absconded.

Fossils
The plant fossil bearing inter-trappean beds of the Rajmahal Formation have been declared National Geological Monuments of India by the Geological Survey of India (GSI), for their protection, maintenance, promotion and the enhancement of geotourism. The fossils here have attracted geologists and palaeobotanists from all over the world. The Birbal Sahni Institute of Palaeobotany in Lucknow has a collection of them. There are fears of these fossils disappearing, as the state government in 2018 gave a mining lease in the area to private companies.

References

Hills of Jharkhand
National Geological Monuments in India